Jan Gerbich (13 December 1900 – 30 August 1994) was a Polish boxer who competed in the 1924 Summer Olympics. In 1924 he was eliminated in the second round of the light heavyweight class after losing his bout to the eventual silver medalist Thyge Petersen of Denmark.

References

External links
Profile 

1900 births
1994 deaths
Light-heavyweight boxers
Olympic boxers of Poland
Boxers at the 1924 Summer Olympics
Sportspeople from Łódź
People from Piotrków Governorate
Polish male boxers